JKT48 is an Indonesian girl group formed in 2011 as a sister group of the Japanese idol group AKB48. Since 2021, members are selected through auditions in Jakarta, Indonesia. Among the members are Trainees who serve as understudies for the main members. Those who leave the group on amiable terms are considered "graduates" and given a last theater show, sometimes accompanied with either a special graduation show or concert.

All of the group's current members are Indonesians. However there had been some Japanese in the group, as well as a Malaysian. Non-Indonesian members are denoted with a flag before their name.

As of 18 March 2023, JKT48 individually has 45 members.

On 11 January 2021, it was announced that the group would forcibly mass-graduate 26 of its members as it was hit by crisis caused by the COVID-19 pandemic and government-imposed large-scale social restrictions. They officially left the group in mid-March 2021.

Overview 
As of 18 March 2023, the group individually consists of 45 members: 24 members from the pre-pandemic era, 8 trainees from the tenth generation, and 14 trainees from the eleventh generation.

Current members and their election record 
Between 2 November 2011 and 23 December 2012 and later from 15 March 2021, there are no teams exist within the group. In between, members were grouped into three teams. The teams were:
Team J, identified with the color red. It existed continuously from 23 December 2012 to 14 March 2021.
Team KIII, identified with the color yellow and blue. It existed continuously from 25 June 2013 to 13 March 2021.
Team T, identified with the color magenta. It existed continuously from 24 January 2015 to 31 December 2019. This team was initially frozen until 31 May 2020, but due to the COVID-19 pandemic in Indonesia which postponed the announcement event (originally planned on 28 March 2020), the team's reestablishment was postponed as well. The announcement of the team's members was eventually held in parts and broadcast live on the group's YouTube channel every evening from 26 May to 4 June 2020. Those who were selected would have officially enter the team on 1 August 2020, subject to the pandemic's development. However, due to the increasing number of cases, the official reestablishment was pushed further into the month; the team was officially reactivated on 22 August. The team was disbanded again after its last show on 12 March 2021.

There were also an Academy, which replaced the term of Research Students or  since 8 April 2018. The academy – existed between 15 April 2018 and 11 March 2021 – was divided into 2 classes, Class A and Class B.

Name outside "( )" are those listed in the member's personal profile on JKT48 website.

Members

Trainees
On 18 December 2021, eight of the tenth generation members came back to the group as trainees. This is the first time since 2018 that this term was used instead of Academy members. On 31 October 2022 the 14 eleventh generation members were announced during a halloween event.

Election rank of former members 
These tables only include members who participated at least once during their tenure in the group.

Name outside "( )" or inside "{ }" are those listed on the member's personal profile on JKT48 website.

{| class="wikitable sortable" style="font-size:95%; text-align:center;"
!colspan=7|Still active during the 2019 election process and left in or after March 2021
|-
! Name
! 2014rank
! 2015rank
! 2016rank
! 2017rank
! 2018rank
! 2019rank
|-
| Cindy Nugroho
| style="background:#bbb;"|  || style="background:#bbb;"|  || style="background:#bbb;"|  || style="background:#bbb;"|  || style="background:#bbb;"|  || style="background:#ececec; text-align:center; color:gray;"| 
|-
| Febi [sic; Feby] Komaril
| style="background:#bbb;"|  || style="background:#bbb;"|  || style="background:#bbb;"|  || style="background:#bbb;"|  || style="background:#ececec; text-align:center; color:gray;"| ||27
|-
| Febrina Diponegoro
| style="background:#bbb;"|  || style="background:#bbb;"|  || style="background:#bbb;"|  || style="background:#bbb;"|  || style="background:#bbb;"|  ||style="background:#ececec; text-align:center; color:gray;"| 
|-
| Gabriella Stevany (Loide Lenggana Harahap)
| style="background:#bbb;"|  || style="background:#bbb;"|  || style="background:#bbb;"|  || style="background:#bbb;"|  || style="background:#bbb;"|  ||style="background:#ececec; text-align:center; color:gray;"| 
|-
| Keisya Ramadhani
| style="background:#bbb;"|  || style="background:#bbb;"|  || style="background:#bbb;"|  || style="background:#bbb;"|  || style="background:#bbb;"|  ||style="background:#ececec; text-align:center; color:gray;"| 
|-
| Aurel Mayori (Putri)
| style="background:#bbb;"|  || style="background:#bbb;"|  || style="background:#bbb;"|  || style="background:#bbb;"|  || style="background:#ececec; text-align:center; color:gray;"| ||31
|-
| Umega Maulana (Sinambela)
| style="background:#bbb;"|  || style="background:#bbb;"|  || style="background:#bbb;"|  || style="background:#bbb;"|  || style="background:#bbb;"|  ||style="background:#ececec; text-align:center; color:gray;"| 
|-
| Viona Fadrin
| style="background:#bbb;"|  || style="background:#bbb;"|  || style="background:#bbb;"|  || style="background:#bbb;"|  || style="background:#ececec; text-align:center; color:gray;"| ||16
|-
| Anastasya Narwastu Tety Handuran
| style="background:#bbb;"|  || style="background:#bbb;"|  || style="background:#bbb;"|  || style="background:#bbb;"|  ||  style="background:#ececec; text-align:center; color:gray;"| || style="background:#ececec; text-align:center; color:gray;"| 
|-
| Fidly Immanda Azzahra
| style="background:#bbb;"|  || style="background:#bbb;"|  || style="background:#ececec; text-align:center; color:gray;"| || style="background:#ececec; text-align:center; color:gray;"| || 24|| 28
|-
| Kandiya Rafa Maulidita
| style="background:#bbb;"|  || style="background:#bbb;"|  || style="background:#bbb;"|  || style="background:#bbb;"|  || style="background:#ececec; text-align:center; color:gray;"| || style="background:#ececec; text-align:center; color:gray;"| 
|-
| Nurhayati
| style="background:#bbb;"|  || style="background:#bbb;"|  || style="background:#bbb;"|  || 26|| 5||4
|-
| Rinanda Syahputri
| style="background:#bbb;"|  || style="background:#bbb;"|  || style="background:#bbb;"|  || style="background:#bbb;"|  || style="background:#ececec; text-align:center; color:gray;"| ||32
|-
| Adriani Elisabeth
| style="background:#bbb;"|  || style="background:#bbb;"|  || style="background:#ececec; text-align:center; color:gray;"| || style="background:#ececec; text-align:center; color:gray;"| || style="background:#ececec; text-align:center; color:gray;"| ||style="background:#ececec; text-align:center; color:gray;"| 
|-
| Amanina Afiqah (Ibrahim)
| style="background:#bbb;"|  || style="background:#bbb;"|  || style="background:#bbb;"|  || style="background:#bbb;"|  || style="background:#bbb;"|  ||style="background:#ececec; text-align:center; color:gray;"| 
|-
| Diani Amalia Ramadhani
| style="background:#bbb;"|  || style="background:#bbb;"|  || style="background:#bbb;"|  || style="background:#ececec; text-align:center; color:gray;"| || style="background:#ececec; text-align:center; color:gray;"| ||14
|-
| Gabriel Angelina (Laeman)
| style="background:#bbb;"|  || style="background:#bbb;"|  || style="background:#bbb;"|  || style="background:#bbb;"|  || style="background:#ececec; text-align:center; color:gray;"| ||style="background:#ececec; text-align:center; color:gray;"| 
|-
| Nabila (Yussi) Fitriana
| style="background:#bbb;"|  || style="background:#bbb;"|  || style="background:#bbb;"|  || style="background:#bbb;"|  || style="background:#ececec; text-align:center; color:gray;"| ||25
|-
| Riska Amelia Putri
| style="background:#bbb;"|  || style="background:#bbb;"|  || style="background:#bbb;"|  || style="background:#bbb;"|  || style="background:#ececec; text-align:center; color:gray;"| ||3
|-
| Sania Julia Montolalu
| style="background:#bbb;"|  || style="background:#bbb;"|  || style="background:#bbb;"|  || style="background:#ececec; text-align:center; color:gray;"| || style="background:#ececec; text-align:center; color:gray;"| ||19
|-
| Zahra Nur (Khaulah)
| style="background:#bbb;"|  || style="background:#bbb;"|  || style="background:#bbb;"|  || style="background:#bbb;"|  || style="background:#bbb;"|  ||style="background:#ececec; text-align:center; color:gray;"|  
|-
| Amirah Fatin (Yasin)
| style="background:#bbb;"|  || style="background:#bbb;"|  || style="background:#bbb;"|  || style="background:#bbb;"|  || style="background:#bbb;"|  
| style="background:#ececec; text-align:center; color:gray;"| 
|-
| Ariella Calista Ichwan
| style="background:#bbb;"|  || style="background:#bbb;"|  || style="background:#bbb;"|  || style="background:#bbb;"|  
| style="background:#ececec; text-align:center; color:gray;"| ||style="text-align:center;"| 29
|-
| Eve Antoinette Ichwan
| style="background:#bbb;"|  || style="background:#bbb;"|  || style="background:#bbb;"|  
| style="background:#ececec; text-align:center; color:gray;"| 
| style="text-align:center;"| 19|| style="background:#ececec; text-align:center; color:gray;"| 
|-
| Aninditha Rahma Cahyadi
| style="background:#ececec; text-align:center; color:gray;"| || style="background:#ececec; text-align:center; color:gray;"| || style="background:#ececec; text-align:center; color:gray;"| 
| style="text-align:center;"| 10|| style="text-align:center;"| 13||style="text-align:center;"| 21
|-
| Cindy Hapsari Maharani Pujiantoro Putri
| style="background:#bbb;"|  || style="background:#bbb;"|  || style="background:#ececec; text-align:center; color:gray;"| 
| 20|| 27|| 7
|-
|  Tan Zhi Hui Celine
| style="background:#bbb;"|  || style="background:#bbb;"|  || style="background:#ececec; text-align:center; color:gray;"| 
| 18|| 22|| 9
|-
| Gabriela Margareth [sic; Margaret]Warouw'| style="background:#ececec; text-align:center; color:gray;"| 
| style="text-align:center;"| 16|| style="text-align:center;"| 13
| style="background:#ececec; text-align:center; color:gray;"| 
| style="text-align:center;"| 29||style="text-align:center;"| 22
|-
| Dhea Angelia
| style="background:#bbb;"|  || style="background:#bbb;"|  || style="background:#bbb;"|  || style="background:#bbb;"|  
| style="background:#ececec; text-align:center; color:gray;"| ||style="text-align:center;"| 26
|-
| Jinan Safa Safira
| style="background:#bbb;"|  || style="background:#bbb;"|  || style="background:#ececec; text-align:center; color:gray;"| 
| style="background:#ececec; text-align:center; color:gray;"| || style="text-align:center;"| 14||style="text-align:center;"| 12
|}

 Members by generation 
Here are all those who has ever been a JKT48 member. They are divided by "generation", or recruitment batch. Names listed below are written in registered form only, except for those whose names were not listed in above sections or those who have their names added on.

 First generation 

The 28 first generation members of JKT48 were selected out of approximately 1,200 applicants. Following interviews in September 2011 and auditions held 8–9 October 2011, 51 candidates were selected to proceed to the second round. These finalists were judged based on their dance performance to AKB48's single "Heavy Rotation", and singing a song of their choice. Members were announced following a six-hour final audition session on 2 November 2011. They were placed in Team J.

Rena Nozawa was the only first generation member who was not an Indonesian and also the first Japanese member in the group.

Upon Gabriela Margaret Warouw's graduation on 14 August 2022, this generation became the third batch to extinct from the group.

 Second generation 

The group's management began accepting applications for second generation members on 13 August 2012. Of the 4,500 applicants, approximately 200 were selected for interviews the following month. The pool was then narrowed down from 67 to 31 in a selection round broadcast by partnering television channel RCTI. All 31 finalists were eventually chosen as second-generation members at a final audition on 3 November 2012 in Japan. Of the second-generation members, 18 were chosen as part of the original Team KIII formed on 25 June 2013, while the rest were grouped as trainees. This is, as of the 11th generation (2022), the only generation never to have any of its members as the group's youngest member.

Upon Rona Ariesta Anggreani's graduation on 15 February 2021 and not counting the then-cancelled tenth generation, this generation became the first to extinct from the group.

 Third generation 

On 4 February 2014, JKT48 announced the names of 63 finalists that are vying to become JKT48 trainees in the third generation.

On 15 March 2014, JKT48 announced selected candidates to become JKT48 newest trainees. This generation brought Kezia Putri Andinta as the first member to be born in the 21st century, on 28 January 2001 to be exact.

Pipit Ananda became the first trainee of this generation to leave the group. She left only nine days into her membership, the shortest ever tenure in JKT48 history until Kanya Cahya broke the record on 6 October 2018 with seven days.

 Fourth generation 

Twelve candidates for trainees from this generation were announced on 16 May 2015 during the Pareo wa Emerald Handshake Festival. From those, ten would eventually promoted as trainees on 31 October 2015.

Tan Zhi Hui Celine became the first Malaysian national to be a JKT48 member and also the first member who is neither Indonesian nor Japanese, albeit she is half-Indonesian by blood.

Upon Jinan Safa Safira's graduation on 18 March 2023, the fourth generation became the fourth to extinct from the group.

 Fifth generation 

Seventeen candidates for trainees from this generation were announced on 28 May 2016 during the Mahagita Handshake Festival in Jakarta. Eight of them were directly promoted as Team T members while six were promoted as trainees on 11 September 2016 during a grand shuffle. The shuffled configuration was effective from 1 December 2016.

Upon Eve Antoinette Ichwan's graduation on 13 February 2022, this generation became the second batch to extinct from the group.

 Sixth generation 

Fourteen recruits from this generation were introduced on 8 April 2018 during a dedicated announcement event in the JKT48 Theater. They went straight into the newly-established JKT48 Academy as the Class B Academy members.

 Seventh generation 

On 29 September 2018, the seventh generation members were announced.

Kanya Cahya broke the record for shortest membership tenure in the group's history, resigning only seven days after her introduction.

 Eighth generation 

The eighth generation members were announced on 27 April 2019. This generation brought two girls as the last members to be born in the 20th century.

 Ninth generation 

The ninth generation members were announced on 1 December 2019.

Tenth generation

The 11 tenth generation members were announced via live streaming on 27 August 2020. On 4 December 2020, their memberships were cancelled due to the internal crisis caused by the COVID-19 pandemic. On 18 December 2021, eight of them were announced to have come back to the group.

Eleventh generation

The 14 eleventh generation members were announced during a halloween event on 31 October 2022. This generation brought Gendis Mayrannisa as the first member to be born in the 2010s, as well as the first twin pair to enter the group in Dena and Desy Natalia.

 Overseas transfers 

During its existence, several Japanese AKB48 members have been transferred to its Jakarta sister group. In 2012, Aki Takajo and Haruka Nakagawa, whose transfers were announced on 24 August, officially joined on 1 November, entered the newly-assembled Team J on 23 December, and made their theater debut on 3 days later. Nakagawa became interested in Jakarta during a visit with other members of AKB48 in February 2012. On 24 February 2014, at the AKB48 Group Dai Sokaku Matsuri (Grand Organization Festival), Takajo was announced to return to AKB48 while Rina Chikano was transferred to JKT48. Chikano then assigned to Team KIII on 11 June 2014. Both Nakagawa and Chikano would graduate here.

During the Jak-Japan Matsuri'' event on 9 September 2018 in Jakarta which featured both groups, Saya Kawamoto was sent in an exchange program for roughly a month. Going the other way was Stephanie Pricilla Indarto Putri, an Indonesian.

Leadership history 
Below is the timeline of leaderships within the group.

Group captaincy

JKT48 captaincy

JKT48 vice-captaincy

Teams captaincy

Team J captaincy

Team KIII captaincy

Team T captaincy

Team T vice-captaincy

Senbatsu career history

Age-related records

Oldest in group

Youngest in group

Notes

References

Bibliography

External links 
 
 
 

JKT48 members
JKT48
JKT48
JKT48